Brannan is a surname. Notable people with the surname include:

 Andy Brannan (1919–1997), Australian rules footballer
 Andrew Brannan (1948–2015), American Vietnam war veteran and criminal
 Charles F. Brannan (1903–1992), United States Secretary of Agriculture, 1948–1953
 John Brannan (1819–1892), US officer who served in the Civil War and Mexican–American War
 Mike Brannan (1955–2013), American golfer
 Samuel Brannan (1819–1889), American businessman and journalist
 Samuel S. Brannan (1835–1880), American politician and newspaper editor
 Solomon Brannan (born 1942), American football player
 Thomas Brannan (1893–1960), English rugby league footballer who played in the 1910s and 1920s

Fictional characters:
 Josh Brannan, character in the NBC series Last Resort